Nikolas Langberg Dyhr (born 18 June 2001) is a Danish professional footballer who plays as a left back for Belgian club Kortrijk on loan from the Danish Superliga club Midtjylland.

Career
Dyhr started playing football at local club, Stensballe IK, with his father as the coach. At the age of 11, he joined the U13 squad of AC Horsens and became the player of the year on the team. Dyhr then moved to FC Midtjylland as a U15 player in 2015. In July 2016, he signed a three-year youth contract and was promoted to the U17 squad.

In September 2018, 17-year old Dyhr was on the bench for Midtjylland in a Danish Cup game against Dalum IF. On 20 June 2019, two days after his 18th birthday, Dyhr signed a five-year professional contract with Midtjylland and was promoted permanently to the first team squad. On 11 August 2019, Dyhr got his official debut against his former club, AC Horsens, in the Danish Superliga. Dyhr played the entire game which Midtjylland won 2-0.

To find more continuity, Dyhr was loaned out to AC Horsens on 17 January 2021 for the rest of the season. He then played two years back at Midtjylland, before joining Belgian Pro League club KV Kortrijk on 30 January 2023: a loan deal until the end of the season.

References

External links
Nikolas Dyhr profile at FC Midtjylland
Nikolas Dyhr at DBU

2001 births
People from Horsens
Sportspeople from the Central Denmark Region
Living people
Danish men's footballers
Association football defenders
Denmark youth international footballers
FC Midtjylland players
AC Horsens players
K.V. Kortrijk players
Danish Superliga players
Danish 1st Division players
Danish expatriate footballers
Danish expatriate sportspeople in Belgium
Expatriate footballers in Belgium